William de Mulsho (died ca. 1376) was a Canon of Windsor from 1361 to 1368 and King's Chamberlain to Edward III from 1365 to 1375.

Career

He was appointed:
Surveyor of the King's Works at Windsor 1358 - 1359
Clerk of the Works at the Tower of London and Westminster Palace 
Rector of Amersham 1361
Prebendary of Abergwili Collegiate Church 1361
Binder of books in St Paul's Cathedral 1361
Prebendary of Bedford Major in Lincoln Cathedral 1361
Prebendary of Dublin 1363
Dean of St Martin's le Grand 1365 - 1368
King's Chamberlain of the Receipt 1365 - 1375
Prebendary of the First Stall in St Stephen's Westminster 1365 - 1368
Prebendary of Hastings
Rector of St Nicholas ad Macellas 1368
Keeper of the (Household) Wardrobe 1375 – 1376

He was appointed to the eighth stall in St George's Chapel, Windsor Castle in 1361, and held the stall until 1368.

Notes 

1370s deaths
Canons of Windsor
Year of birth missing